Daniel Magnusson is a Swedish professional ice hockey centre who currently plays for Östersunds IK of the Hockeyettan league. He previously played for Modo Hockey of the Elitserien.

References

External links

Living people
Modo Hockey players
1991 births
Swedish ice hockey centres